The discography of American country artist, Melba Montgomery contains 29 studio albums, eight compilation albums, 61 singles, one other charting song and has appeared on five albums. Of her studio albums, 22 are solo releases while seven are collaborative releases. Of her singles, 42 are solo releases while 18 are collaborative. Montgomery collaborated with George Jones on 1963's "We Must Have Been Out of Our Minds", which reached number three on the Billboard Hot Country Songs chart. Together, they recorded several studio albums including What's in Our Heart (1963), which reached number three on the Billboard Top Country Albums chart. The United Artists and Musicor labels issued several more singles by the pair. Among them were the top 25 songs "Multiply the Heartaches" (1965) and "Party Pickin'" (1967). She also collaborated with Gene Pitney during the sixties on the top 20 single "Baby Ain't That Fine" (1965). Both United Artists and Musicor issued several solo studio albums and singles by Montgomery during the sixties also. Among them was the charting single "Hall of Shame" (1963) and the 1967 LP, Don't Keep Me Lonely Too Long (1967). 

In 1970, Montgomery teamed up with Charlie Louvin to record the top 20 country single "Something to Brag About". Their 1970 LP of the same name made the Billboard country albums chart as well. Montgomery's solo music did not become commercially-successful until she began recording for Elektra Records in 1973. The single "Wrap Your Love Around Me" (1973) charted in the Billboard country top 40. In 1974, she reached her peak solo success with the single "No Charge". The track topped the country songs chart, crossed over onto the Billboard Hot 100 and topped the RPM country chart in Canada. Her 1974 solo LP of the same name reached number 14 on the Top Country Albums chart. Montgomery followed it with the charting LP Don't Let the Good Times Fool You in 1975. Its title track reached the top 20 of the country charts. Her second self-titled studio LP spawned a cover of "Angel of the Morning", which reached number 22 on the Billboard country chart. Montgomery has continued sporadically releasing singles and albums since the early eighties. Her most recent album is Things That Keep You Going (2010).

Albums

Solo studio albums

Collaborative studio albums

Compilation albums

Singles

As a solo artist

As a collaborative artist

Other charted songs

Other appearances

Notes

References

External links 
 

Country music discographies
Discographies of American artists